Al-Buraimi is an oasis city and a wilayah (province) in northern Oman, on the border between Oman and the United Arab Emirates. It is the capital of the Al Buraimi Governorate. An adjacent city on the UAE's side of the border is Al Ain. Both settlements are part of the historical region of Tawam or Al-Buraimi Oasis.

See also 
 Al Qabil
 Hamasah
 Mahdah
 Sunaynah

References 

Populated places in Al Buraimi Governorate